Sunshine Coast may refer to: 

 Sunshine Coast, Queensland, Australia
Sunshine Coast Region, a local government area of Queensland named after the region
Sunshine Coast Stadium
 Sunshine Coast (British Columbia), geographic subregion of the British Columbia Coast
Sunshine Coast Regional District, regional district of British Columbia

See also
 Costa del Sol
 The Sunrise Coast, Suffolk, United Kingdom